Mitoc may refer to several places in Romania:

Mitoc, Botoșani, a commune in Botoșani County
Mitoc, a village in Leorda Commune, Botoșani County
Mitoc, a village in Șipote Commune, Iași County
Mitoc, a village in Banca Commune, Vaslui County
Mitoc (river), a tributary of the Suceava in Suceava County

and to:

Mitoc, Orhei, a commune in Orhei district, Moldova
or:

 MIT Outing Club